Mike Kinsey (born 1939) is an English actor turned politician.

Kinsey is best known for playing the part of Gunner 'Nosher' Evans in the BBC sitcom It Ain't Half Hot Mum.
Amongst other roles, he has also played a reporter in the 1976 drama Nightmare for a Nightingale, and a farmer in Dangerfield in 1997.

In May 2002, he was elected as a Labour Party councillor in the ward of Greenhill in the London Borough of Harrow. He stood down from Greenhill at the 2006 local elections.

References

External links

English male television actors
Labour Party (UK) councillors
Councillors in the London Borough of Harrow
Living people
People from Bilston
1939 births